Kozhanka may refer to the following places in Ukraine:

Kozhanka, Kyiv Oblast, urban-type settlement in Kyiv Oblast
Kozhanka, Vinnytsia Oblast, village in Vinnytsia Oblast